Margaret Bethune (2 October 1820 – 20 April 1887), born Margaret Peebles, was a Scottish midwife who kept a detailed register of almost 1300 births she attended in Largo parish in Fife. Her register survives as a rich record for the history of midwifery in Scotland.

Early life 
Bethune was born in Peebles, the daughter of Margaret Walker, a linen worker, and Andrew Peebles, a weaver of Lundin Mill.

Career 
In order to provide for her young children and elderly mother, the widowed Bethune moved from Largo to Edinburgh in 1852, to seek midwifery training. She purchased a copy of Alexander Hamilton's Concise Rules for the Conduct of Midwives in the Exercise of their Profession, published in 1793, and gained a ticket to work on the wards at a maternity hospital in Edinburgh.

Bethune returned to her family in 1853, and began working as a midwife or "howdie" in her community. Bethune kept a casebook, recording 1,296 labours she attended, all within the parish of Largo, with only two maternal deaths registered. She was a respected and able midwife, and she attended to the vast majority of births in her parish for several decades.

Personal life and legacy 
In 1844, she married William Bethune, a coal miner. They had two children, Margaret (born 1845) and William (born 1847). She was widowed at age 32, when her husband died in a mining accident. Margaret Bethune died from heart disease in Largo in 1887, aged 66 years. Her casebook is preserved in the National Records of Scotland. Bethune's register was featured in a 2015 exhibit in Edinburgh, marking the centenary of the Midwives Act of 1915.

References

External links 

 Cameron, Anne Marie. From ritual to regulation? The development of midwifery in Glasgow and the West of Scotland, c.1740-1840 (PhD dissertation, University of Glasgow 2003).

1820 births
1887 deaths
People from Peebles
Scottish midwives
People from Fife